Sarah MacDougall is a Swedish Canadian singer/songwriter currently living in Whitehorse, Yukon, Canada.

Born in Malmö, Sweden, MacDougall moved to Canada to study music in Vancouver when she was a teenager. Her first tour took her in Whitehorse, where she decided to live. For her 2018 album, All the Hours I Have Left to Tell You Anything, MacDougall enlisted Montreal-based producer Marcus Paquin, who has engineered albums for The National and Arcade Fire.
In 2019, MacDougall toured with Ivan Coyote, playing songs with a band and participating in Coyote's spoken-word performances.

Discography 
All the Hours I Have Left to Tell You Anything, 2018
Grand Canyon, 2015
The Greatest Ones Alive, 2011
Across the Atlantic, 2009
I Don't Want To Be Alone Anymore, 2008 EP

Awards 
2012 Western Canadian Music Award – Roots Solo Recording of the Year – Sarah MacDougall – The Greatest Ones Alive

References

External links 
Official Website
Facebook
Twitter
Instagram

Living people
Canadian people of Swedish descent
Canadian women singer-songwriters
Musicians from Yukon
People from Whitehorse
Year of birth missing (living people)
21st-century Canadian women singers
Canadian folk singer-songwriters